Musa Pak Express is a passenger train operated daily by Pakistan Railways between Multan and Lahore. The train named after Syed Abul Hassab Musa Pak, a famous Sufi saint who lived in Multan between 1535–1592.

Route 
 Multan Cantonment–Lahore Junction via Karachi–Peshawar Railway Line

Station stops

Equipment 
The train offers AC Business class and economy accommodations.

References 

Named passenger trains of Pakistan
Passenger trains in Pakistan